The 1999–2000 season in Argentine football saw River Plate win both the league championships, while Boca Juniors won the Copa Libertadores 2000 and Talleres de Córdoba won the 1999 Copa CONMEBOL to become the first team from Córdoba Province to win a major international title.

Torneo Apertura ("Opening" Tournament)

Top Scorers

Relegation

There is no relegation after the Apertura. For the relegation results of this tournament see below

Torneo Clausura ("Closing" Tournament)

Top Scorers

Relegation

Relegation table

Relegation playoffs

The teams draw 4-4 therefore Belgrano stay in the Argentine First Division.
Quilmes remains in Argentine Nacional B.

Almagro win 2–1 and are promoted to the Argentine First Division.
Instituto are relegated to the Argentine Nacional B.

Argentine clubs in international competitions

National team
This section covers the Argentina national team's matches from August 1, 1999, to July 31, 2000.

Friendly matches

2002 World Cup qualifiers

References

External links
AFA
Argentina on FIFA.com
Argentina 1999–2000 by Javier Romiser at rsssf.